Chlorocala africana is a species of flower beetle belonging to the family Scarabaeidae.

Description
This species is the most common of the genus Chlorocala. It has an elongated body with various shades of iridescent green, red or purple colours, and this variation has led many authors to describe numerous subspecies of doubtful taxonomic identity. They are easy to breed, highly fertile and the development is relatively fast.

Distribution
This species occurs in the afrotropical region (Democratic Republic of the Congo, Uganda, Tanzania, Ivory Coast, Ghana, Togo).

Gallery

References
 biolib

africana
Beetles of Africa
Beetles described in 1773
Taxa named by Dru Drury